Collateral is a four-part British television drama serial, written and created by David Hare, and directed by S. J. Clarkson. It was first broadcast on BBC Two on 12 February 2018.

The series, described by Hare as "a police procedural without any of that police attitudinising", stars Carey Mulligan as DI Kip Glaspie, assigned to investigate the shooting of a pizza delivery driver in inner city south London. The ensuing story explores a complex web of characters who are all somehow connected with the story. Nathaniel Martello-White stars as Glaspie's partner, DS Nathan Bilk. Jeany Spark, Nicola Walker, John Simm and Billie Piper are also credited as principal members of the cast.

The series was Hare's first original series for television, despite having written for the BBC since 1973. Piers Wenger, the BBC's head of drama, described the series as "a contemporary and thought-provoking state-of-the-nation thriller that pushes the boundaries of what audiences expect

The show was produced by The Forge and distributed worldwide by All3Media, which brought Netflix on board to co-produce the series and release it internationally on 9 March 2018. Dazzler Media released a DVD of the series on 26 March 2018.

Cast 
 Carey Mulligan as Detective Inspector Kip Glaspie
 John Simm as David Mars MP, Shadow Secretary of State for Transport
 Billie Piper as Karen Mars, David's ex-wife
 Nicola Walker as the Reverend Jane Oliver
 Nathaniel Martello-White as Detective Sergeant Nathan Bilk
 Jeany Spark as Captain Sandrine Shaw, British Army
 Hayley Squires as Laurie Stone, manager of Regal Pizza
 Ahd Kamel as Fatima Asif, sister of Abdullah Asif
 July Namir as Mona Asif, sister of Abdullah Asif
 Kae Alexander as Linh Xuan Huy, principal witness
 Ben Miles as Detective Superintendent Jack Haley
 Rob Jarvis as Detective Constable Euan Johnson
 Vineeta Rishi as Detective Constable Rakhee Shah
 Robert Portal as Major Tim Dyson, Sandrine Shaw's senior officer
 Orla Brady as Phoebe Dyson, Major Tim Dyson's wife
 John Heffernan as Sam Spence, MI5 agent
 Maya Sansa as Berna Yalaz, undercover MI5 agent
 Nick Mohammed as Fuzz Gupta, Area Forensic Manager
 Kim Medcalf as Suki Vincent, BBC news anchor
 Jacqueline Boatswain as Monique
 Richard McCabe as Peter Westbourne, owner of Pimlico Travel
 Brian Vernel as Mikey Gowans, employee at Regal Pizza
 Deborah Findlay as Eleanor Shaw, Sandrine's mother
 Saskia Reeves as Deborah Clifford MP, Leader of the Opposition and of the Labour Party
 George Georgiou as Mehmet Akman, smuggler
 Nicola Duffett as Alice Stone, Laurie Stone's mother
 Vera Chok as Jill Leong, TV news reporter
 Adrian Lukis as Xan Schofield (psychiatrist)

Episodes

Critical reception
On Rotten Tomatoes, the series holds an approval rating of 79%. The website's critics consensus reads, "Collaterals social commentary is sometimes overbearing, but strong performances cut through an overcrowded script to suggest that good intentions can count for something." Hindustan Times called it "an addictive murder mystery", while First Post said it "manages to ask important questions but doesn't provide any answers".

Accolades
In March 2019, Collateral received two nominations at the 2019 British Academy Television Awards in "Best Photography & Lighting: Fiction" and "British Academy Television Award for Best Supporting Actress" for Billie Piper.

References

External links
 
 

2018 British television series debuts
2018 British television series endings
2010s British crime drama television series
2010s British mystery television series
2010s British television miniseries
BBC crime television shows
BBC television dramas
BBC television miniseries
English-language Netflix original programming
Murder in television
Television shows directed by S. J. Clarkson
Television shows set in London
Television series by All3Media